The 22nd Vancouver Film Critics Circle Awards were presented on March 7, 2022, to honour the films selected by the Vancouver Film Critics Circle as the best of 2021. Although usually presented in December of the same year for which the awards are presented, these awards were delayed to the winter of 2022, due to the COVID-19 pandemic in Canada and the associated complications in film production and distribution.

Nominations were announced on February 20.

Winners and nominees

International

Canadian

References

External links
 

2019
2021 film awards
2021 in Canadian cinema
2021 in British Columbia